Niall O'Shaughnessy (November 23, 1955 – September 16, 2015 Alpharetta, Georgia) was an Irish track and field athlete, specializing in middle distances.  He represented Ireland in the 800 metres and 1500 metres at the 1976 Olympics.  In the 1500, he finished less than .2 behind former 880 world record holder Rick Wohlhuter who took the last qualifying spot in his heat behind eventual double silver medalist Ivo Van Damme and bronze medalist Paul-Heinz Wellmann.  Earlier in the 800, Van Damme had also defeated O'Shaughnessy in the heats, en route to his other silver medal.

O'Shaughnessy came from Kilknockan, County Limerick and attended St Munchin's College but was recruited by Irishman John McDonnell to the University of Arkansas in the United States where he eventually settled.  He was the 1974 Southwest Conference champion in the indoor 880.  He was All American in cross-country, indoor track, and outdoor track.  He was inducted into the University of Arkansas Athletic Hall of Honor in 1994.

He later gained American citizenship and became an engineer in Little Rock and Atlanta.

O'Shaughnessy died at 59 as a consequence of brain cancer.  After his death he was inducted into the Southwest Conference Hall of Fame.

References

1955 births
2015 deaths
Athletes (track and field) at the 1976 Summer Olympics
Olympic athletes of Ireland
Irish male middle-distance runners
People educated at St Munchin's College
Arkansas Razorbacks men's track and field athletes
Deaths from brain tumor
Irish emigrants to the United States
Arkansas Razorbacks men's cross country runners